Julian Christopher Merryweather (born October 14, 1991) is an American professional baseball pitcher for the Chicago Cubs of Major League Baseball (MLB). He has previously played in MLB for the Toronto Blue Jays.

Early life and college career
Merryweather attended Junípero Serra High School in San Mateo, California, and played college baseball at Skyline College and Oklahoma Baptist University. In two seasons with the Bison, Merryweather pitched to a 22–5 win–loss record, 1.73 earned run average (ERA), and 208 strikeouts.

Professional career

Cleveland Indians

Draft and minor leagues
The Cleveland Indians selected Merryweather in the fifth round of the 2014 Major League Baseball draft. He made his professional debut with the Mahoning Valley Scrappers going 1–2 with a 3.66 ERA in 13 games. He pitched 2015 with the Lake County Captains, posting a 4.08 ERA in 70 innings, and 2016 with the Lynchburg Hillcats and Akron RubberDucks, going a combined 13–6 with 2.60 ERA in 24 games started between both teams. Merryweather started 2017 with Akron and was promoted to the Columbus Clippers during the season. In 25 total games between Akron and Columbus, Merryweather pitched to a 7–9 record and 5.32 ERA. The Indians added him to their 40-man roster after the season.

Merryweather injured his pitching elbow during the Indians' 2018 spring training camp. The Indians subsequently announced he would need Tommy John surgery and would miss the entire 2018 season.

Toronto Blue Jays
On October 5, 2018, Merryweather was sent to the Toronto Blue Jays as the player to be named later from the earlier trade for Josh Donaldson.

In 2019, Merryweather made two appearances in the 2019 minor league season, and played for the Scottsdale Scorpions of the Arizona Fall League during the offseason.

Major leagues
Merryweather made his major league debut on August 20, 2020 against the Philadelphia Phillies. On August 26, 2020, he made his first MLB start. With the 2020 Toronto Blue Jays, Merryweather appeared in 13 games, compiling a 0-0 record with 4.15 ERA and 15 strikeouts in 13 innings pitched.

On May 5, 2021, Merryweather was placed on the 60-day injured list with an oblique strain. On September 8, Merryweather was activated off of the injured list. 

Merryweather was designated for assignment by the Blue Jays on January 10, 2023, after the signing of Brandon Belt became official.

Chicago Cubs
On January 17, 2023, Merryweather was claimed off waivers by the Chicago Cubs.

References

External links

1991 births
Living people
Akron RubberDucks players
Baseball players from Berkeley, California
Buffalo Bisons (minor league) players
Columbus Clippers players
Dunedin Blue Jays players
Gulf Coast Blue Jays players
Lake County Captains players
Lynchburg Hillcats players
Mahoning Valley Scrappers players
Major League Baseball pitchers
Oklahoma Baptist Bison baseball players
Scottsdale Scorpions players
Toronto Blue Jays players
Florida Complex League Blue Jays players
Junípero Serra High School (San Mateo, California) alumni